Next Gen Films is an Indian motion picture production and distribution company based in Mumbai. The company was founded in 2008 by Bollywood producer Viki Rajani. The company is mostly known for making films like Desi Boyz and Table No.21. Next Gen's most films are co-produced or distributed by Eros International.In 2019 It was renamed under Faith Films.

Filmography

External links 
Official Website

Film production companies based in Mumbai
2008 establishments in Maharashtra
Mass media companies established in 2008
Indian companies established in 2008